The Pharmaceutical Accountability Foundation (in Dutch Stichting Farma Ter Verantwoording) was established in Amsterdam in July 2018 to deal with pharmaceutical companies that demand excessive prices for medicines in the Netherlands. Wilbert Bannenberg, an epidemiologist, is the chairman. The group plans to deploy both health and pharmaceutical expertise and lawyers.

They have investigated 12 cases all with the same business model, which they describe as: "buy an old, cheap product, get the old versions off the market, win orphan drug designation, and put up the price as high as you can." They say that European orphan drug legislation needs to be reformed.

It plans to make a referral to the Netherlands Authority for Consumers and Markets in respect of the pricing policy of Leadiant Biosciences Ltd, formerly known as Sigma-Tau Rare Disease, for chenodeoxycholic acid which is used to treat about 60 children with cerebrotendineous xanthomatosis in the Netherlands. The company now sells this medicine at €140 per capsule, about €153,300 per patient per year. Previously it was sold under the name Chenofalk for the treatment of gallstones at a cost of €0.28 per capsule and used off label for the treatment of cerebrotendineous xanthomatosis. Sigma-Tau acquired the rights in 2008.  The European Medicines Agency approved chenodeoxycholic acid for the treatment of cerebrotendinous xanthomatosis. Leadiant, having secured orphan drug designation, and bought up rival suppliers, raised the price, as they were entitled to ten years market exclusivity in the European Union. Bannenberg claims that Leadiant is abusing its dominant market position. The VU University Medical Center are proposing to manufacture their own version at cost price, and this has been supported by Dutch health insurers. Leadiant has been compared to Martin Shkreli. Bannanberg is quoted as saying “This may be legal but it’s not socially acceptable.” The foundation's complaints have been echoed by Bruno Bruins, Minister for Medical Care. The track record of the Netherlands Authority for Consumers and Markets and previously of the Netherlands Competition Authority in the medicines sector has been described as poor. 

Under political pressure, the pharmaceutical companies in the Netherlands have been working on a code of conduct which they say will provide guarantees for responsible pricing, and keep speculators out of the door.

In April 2020, Bannenberg said that the Netherlands' vulnerability to medicine shortages had been exposed by the COVID-19 pandemic in the Netherlands because the country was too dependent on medicines from low-wage countries and vaccines from big pharma. The Netherlands was not a priority for supply. He wanted to see more local production and different manufacturers, even if this meant that generic drugs would be more expensive.

References

Pharmaceutical industry

Orphan drugs
Organisations based in Amsterdam